Hardystonite is a rare calcium zinc silicate mineral first described from the Franklin, New Jersey, U.S. zinc deposits.  It often contains lead, which was detrimental to the zinc smelting process, so it was not a useful ore mineral. Like many of the famous Franklin minerals, hardystonite responds to short wave ultraviolet (254 nm wavelength) light, emitting a fluorescence from dark purple to bright violet blue.  In daylight, it is white to gray to light pink in color, sometimes with a vitreous or greasy luster.  It is very rarely found as well formed crystals, and these are usually rectangular in appearance and rock-locked.
 
Hardystonite has a chemical composition of Ca2ZnSi2O7. It is frequently found with willemite (fluoresces green), calcite (fluoresces red), and clinohedrite (fluoresces orange).  Hardystonite can be found altered to clinohedrite CaZn(SiO4)·H2O  through direct hydrothermal alteration.
Other minerals often associated with hardystonite are franklinite, diopside, andradite garnet, and esperite (fluoresces yellow).

It was first described in 1899 by J.E. Wolff, when the New Jersey Zinc Company mines were located in what was called Franklin Furnace, in Hardyston Township, New Jersey.

References

Calcium minerals
Sorosilicates
Zinc minerals
Tetragonal minerals
Minerals in space group 113
Minerals described in 1899